Kitsk, is an abandoned village in the Kajaran Municipality of Syunik Province of Armenia. The National Statistical Service of the Republic of Armenia (ARMSTAT) reported that it was uninhabited at the 2001 and 2011 censuses. At the 2001 census, Kitsk was part of the rural community of Karut.

References

Former populated places in Syunik Province